The Beaver Main Post Office, in Beaver, Utah, was built in 1941.  It reflects Moderne architecture and Colonial Revival architecture.  It was listed on the National Register of Historic Places in 1989 as U.S. Post Office — Beaver Main.

It is a buff-colored brick building with a copper-clad hipped roof.

References

Post office buildings on the National Register of Historic Places in Utah
Colonial Revival architecture in Utah
Government buildings completed in 1941
Buildings and structures in Beaver County, Utah
Moderne architecture in Utah
Post office buildings in Utah
Government buildings in Utah
National Register of Historic Places in Beaver County, Utah
1941 establishments in Utah